Eupithecia niveivena is a moth in the family Geometridae. It is found in Sri Lanka and Thailand.

The forewings have a rich reddish-brown colour with a whitish-yellow transverse line.

References

Moths described in 1928
niveivena
Moths of Asia